Diadegma areolare is a wasp first described by August Emil Holmgren in 1860.  No subspecies are listed.

References

areolare
Insects described in 1860
Taxa named by August Holmgren